Mallan Roberts (born 6 June 1992) is a Canadian professional soccer player who plays as a centre back for Heidelberg United FC in the NPL Victoria.

Career

Youth
Born in Freetown, Sierra Leone, Roberts began playing soccer in Sierra Leone before continuing to play the game in Edmonton, Alberta after he and his father fled from Sierra Leone due to the Sierra Leone Civil War. While in high-school Roberts started to play Canadian Football for his high-school side and then for the local Canadian Junior Football League side, the Edmonton Huskies. He also spent a few weeks training with Canadian Football League side, the Edmonton Eskimos before going back into soccer and playing with the Northern Alberta Institute of Technology soccer team before joining the FC Edmonton reserves in 2012.

FC Edmonton
On 20 February 2013 it was announced that Roberts had signed his first professional contract with FC Edmonton of the North American Soccer League. He then made his professional debut for FC Edmonton in a Canadian Championship match against the Vancouver Whitecaps FC in which started and played the full 90 minutes as Edmonton lost the match 2–3. Roberts then scored his first professional goal of his career on 30 June 2013 against Minnesota United FC in an NASL match in which he found the net in the 11th minute as FC Edmonton went on to win the match 3–1.

Ottawa Fury
On 4 June 2016 Ottawa Fury FC announced it had acquired Roberts on loan to provide depth in the absence of defenders Kyle Venter and Rich Balchan due to injury. In December 2016, the Fury announced that Roberts would not return to the team as the club moved to USL in 2017.

Richmond Kickers
After 4 seasons in Edmonton, Roberts signed with Richmond Kickers of the United Soccer League in February 2017.

Tulsa Roughnecks
On January 4, 2019, Roberts joined USL Championship side FC Tulsa.

International
Roberts had said he was open to representing either Sierra Leone or Canada.

Sierra Leone
Sierra Leone attempted to call up Roberts twice in 2014 for Africa Cup of Nations qualifying, but due to the Ebola Epidemic in West Africa, and coaching issues with the team, he was unable to join the squad.

Canada
Roberts was expecting to gain Canadian citizenship sometime during the summer of 2013. Roberts finally received his Canadian citizenship on February 12, 2015. On June 6, 2015, Roberts received his first call up from Canada coach Benito Floro to the senior squad for two 2018 FIFA World Cup qualification matches against Dominica as a replacement for an injured Dejan Jaković. He made his debut in the return leg against Dominica as a late substitute on June 16 and as a result, became cap-tied to Canada.

Career statistics

Club

International

References

External links 

 Mallan Roberts at Richmond Kickers
 

1992 births
Living people
Association football defenders
Canadian soccer players
Canadian expatriate soccer players
FC Edmonton players
Ottawa Fury FC players
Richmond Kickers players
FC Tulsa players
North American Soccer League players
USL Championship players
Sportspeople from Freetown
Soccer players from Edmonton
Canada men's international soccer players